Ganopristidae is an extinct family of cartilaginous fish from the Cretaceous belonging to the suborder Sclerorhynchoidei. While the name Sclerorhynchidae is often used for this family, it is a junior synonym of Ganopristidae. This family contains the genera Libanopristis, Micropristis, and Sclerorhynchus. The type genus Ganopristis is considered to be a junior synonym of Sclerorhynchus.

References

Prehistoric cartilaginous fish families
Rajiformes